The Swainson Islands are an unpopulated group of five islands and rocks located off the south western coast of Tasmania, Australia. The  group of islands are situated close to the southern end of the western coast of Tasmania, where the mouth of Port Davey meets the Southern Ocean. The Swainson Islands are part of the Southwest National Park and the Tasmanian Wilderness World Heritage Site.

The islands that comprise the group are:

Fauna
The island group is part of the  Port Davey Islands Important Bird Area, identified by BirdLife International because of its importance of supporting more than one percent of the world population of short-tailed shearwater, fairy prion, little penguin and black-faced cormorant.

See also

 List of islands of Tasmania

References

Islands of South West Tasmania
Protected areas of Tasmania